This list of radio stations in Bucharest, Romania. There are 27 FM stations in Bucharest.

Radio Stations

Internet radio
 Social FM 
 METRONOM FM Romania
 Radio RO GOLD
 FUN Radio Bucharest
 Vox-T Radio
 Transylvanian Unitarian Radio
  Fake.fm Radio
 Dance.RO
 MegaHit
 Radio Downed

External links
 Predavatel.ro - Radio stations in Romania and the Balkans

Radio stations
Mass media in Romania